John Leif Krantz (15 April 1932 – 28 December 2012) was a Swedish television producer, screenwriter and film director.

Leif Krantz was born in 1932 in Gothenburg. He began his career as an assistant director during the filming of Astrid Lindgren's Vi på Saltkråkan (1964). He broke through in the late 1960s with popular television dramas such as Kullamannen (1967) and Kråkguldet (1969), and later with Pojken med guldbyxorna (1975) and Sinkadus (1980). Krantz also wrote the screenplay for the animated films Peter-No-Tail (1981) and Agaton Sax och Byköpings gästabud (1976). Leif Krantz died in 2012 in Sköndal south of Stockholm after brief illness.

Filmography

 1964: Vi på Saltkråkan (TV) - assistant director
 1964: Tjorven, Båtsman och Moses (TV)  - assistant director
 1965: Modiga mindre män (TV)  - director, screenplay
 1967-1968: Kullamannen" (TV) - director
 1969: Kråkguldet (TV) - director, screenplay
 1972: Barnen i höjden (TV) - director, screenplay
 1972: Stora skälvan (TV) - director, screenplay
 1975: Pojken med guldbyxorna (TV) - director, screenplay
 1976: Agaton Sax och Byköpings gästabud director, screenplay
 1976: Schaurige Geschichten (TV) - director, screenplay
 1977: Ärliga blå ögon (TV) director, screenplay
 1977: Så går det till på Saltkråkan (TV) - assistant director
 1980: Sinkadus (TV) - director, screenplay
 1981: Pelle Svanslös - screenplay
 1983: Öbergs på Lillöga (TV) director, screenplay
 1985: Pelle Svanslös i Amerikatt - screenplay
 1985: Vägen till Gyllenblå!" (TV) - director
 1986: Skånska mord - Bessingemordet (TV) - director
 1988      Stoft och skugga (TV) - director, screenplay
 1989: Amforans gåta (TV) - director, screenplay
 1993-1995: Snoken (TV) - director
 2000      Ramakien (short film for TV) - director, screenplay

References

1932 births
2012 deaths
Swedish film directors
Swedish screenwriters
Swedish male screenwriters
People from Gothenburg
Swedish television producers
20th-century Swedish people